Chishminsky (masculine), Chishminskaya (feminine), or Chishminskoye (neuter) may refer to:
Chishminsky District, a district of the Republic of Bashkortostan, Russia
Chishminsky Settlement Council, an administrative division of Chishminsky District in the Republic of Bashkortostan, Russia which the work settlement of Chishmy is incorporated as
Chishminsky Urban Settlement, a municipal formation which Chishminsky Settlement Council in Chishminsky District of the Republic of Bashkortostan, Russia is incorporated as